Ricky Hatton vs. Paulie Malignaggi, billed as the Power vs. Precision, was a boxing light welterweight match-up for the IBO and The Ring titles that was held on November 22, 2008 at the MGM Grand Las Vegas. The fight was won by Ricky Hatton as Paulie Malignaggi was withdrawn by his corner during the 11th round.

Build-up
Ricky Hatton had been at the top of the rankings since his victory over Kostya Tszyu and followed up with wins over Juan Urango, José Luis Castillo and Juan Lazcano. Malignaggi was the former IBF champion who had beaten the likes of Herman NGoudjo and Lovemore N'Dou. Both of the fighters fought on the same bill in Manchester, England at Hatton's Homecoming fight at the City of Manchester Stadium following his loss to Floyd Mayweather Jr., Hatton winning a unanimous decision against Juan Lazcano and Malignaggi winning a split decision against Lovermore N'Dou. During Malignaggi's fight he had to get a haircut in between the rounds.
Another Major event that preceded the fight was the firing of long term trainer Billy Graham by Hatton and employing Floyd Mayweather Sr., father of the only man to beat him, at that time, into his corner. Malignaggi's trainer Buddy McGirt remained adamant that Hatton was past his best and insisted Malignaggi would beat him. Hatton did admit that if he was beaten he would retire.

The fight
Michael Buffer introduced the fight on HBO World Championship Boxing and the referee was Kenny Bayless.
Malignaggi started off the fight well, winning the first round by utilising his jab and getting a rhythm, However, in the second round a massive right by Hatton shook Malignaggi and he had to hold on for the rest of the round. From then on Hatton took control and won all the other rounds, with more big shots and combinations, until Malignaggi's trainer, Buddy McGirt threw in the towel in the 11th round. McGirt had warned Malignaggi that if he didn't do better in the next round he would pull him out and he stuck to his word.
Hatton jumped up onto the ropes as Malignaggi furiously protested to, and pushed McGirt. However the final scores of 99-91 from all three judges proved that Malignaggi would not have been able to defeat Hatton on points in the remaining rounds.

Aftermath
It was always thought that if Hatton won he would have fought the winner of Manny Pacquiao vs. Oscar De La Hoya. When Manny Pacquiao defeated De La Hoya it was arranged that they will meet on May 2 in Las Vegas. Hatton was swiftly defeated. Malignaggi contemplated retirement but decided to fight on for money.

Undercard
 Matthew Hatton defeats  Ben Tackie via unanimous decision.
 James Kirkland KOs  Brian Vera in the eighth round.
 Sirimongkol Singwancha defeats  Rogelio Castaneda Jr via majority decision.
 Heriberto Ruiz defeats  Rey Bautista via unanimous decision.
 Adrien Broner KOs  Terrance Jett in the sixth round.
 Danny Garcia defeats  Adan Hernandez via unanimous decision.
 Hylon Williams Jr. defeats  Ramon Flores via unanimous decision.
 Adrian Gonzalez defeats  Jose Pacheco via unanimous decision.

References

Boxing matches
2008 in boxing
Boxing in Las Vegas
2008 in sports in Nevada
November 2008 sports events in the United States
MGM Grand Garden Arena
Boxing on HBO